Elmer G. Horton was an American football and baseball coach. He was the eighth head football coach at Wabash College in Crawfordsville, Indiana, serving for one season, in 1893 season, and compiling a record of 2–4. Horton was also the head baseball coach at Wabash from 1893 to 1894, tallying a mark of 3–8.

Head coaching record

Football

References

Year of birth missing
Year of death missing
Wabash Little Giants baseball coaches
Wabash Little Giants football coaches
Cornell University alumni